The 2012 FIBA U16 European Championship Division B was the 9th edition of the Division B of the European basketball championship for national under-16 teams. It was played from 19 to 29 July 2012 in Bucharest, Romania. Belgium men's national under-16 basketball team won the tournament.

Participating teams

  (15th place, 2011 FIBA Europe Under-16 Championship Division A)

  (16th place, 2011 FIBA Europe Under-16 Championship Division A)

First round
In the first round, the teams were drawn into four groups. The first two teams from each group advance to the quarterfinal groups; the third and fourth teams advance to the 9th–16th place classification groups; the other teams will play in the 17th–21st place classification groups.

Group A

Group B

Group C

Group D

17th–21st place classification

Group I

Group J

17th–20th place playoffs

19th place match

17th place match

9th–16th place classification

Group G

Group H

13th–16th place playoffs

13th–16th place semifinals

15th place match

13th place match

9th–12th place playoffs

9th–12th place semifinals

11th place match

9th place match

1st–8th place classification

Group E

Group F

5th–8th place playoffs

5th–8th place semifinals

7th place match

5th place match

Championship playoffs

Semifinals

3rd place match

Final

Final standings

References

FIBA U16 European Championship Division B
2012–13 in European basketball
International youth basketball competitions hosted by Romania
FIBA U16
July 2012 sports events in Europe
Sports competitions in Bucharest